Wilderness Canoe Base is a Christian youth camp that borders the Boundary Waters Canoe Area Wilderness on Seagull Lake near the end of the Gunflint Trail, about 50 miles from Grand Marais, Minnesota, USA. The camp hosts canoe camping trips and work-service trips for youth during the summer as well as retreats for all ages year round. Part of the camp is on the northern half of Fishhook Island and another tract resides on nearby Dominion Island. It has been under the management of Lake Wapogasset Lutheran Bible Camp, Inc. since 2002.

Ham Lake fire 
Almost one third of the 138 structures destroyed by the Ham Lake fire in May 2007 were part of Wilderness Canoe Base. Of the camp's 60 structures, 40 were consumed by flames, including outhouses and staff cabins.  A year later Wilderness raised nearly $200,000 to rebuild the camp. Another $100,000 came in the form of matching funds from Thrivent Financial for Lutherans.  Reconstruction and fund-raising are ongoing as many of the structures have yet to be rebuilt.

History 
The first piece of land purchased in 1956 for $12,000 by Plymouth Christian Youth Center, included the upper half of Fishhook Island.  Camp directors, Ham Muus and Bob Evans, led 120 boys in a camping experience which included little or none of the facilities that the camp enjoys today.

By 1958 the number of facilities available at the camp increased several fold.  Among many other structures, three log cabins, a boathouse, fourteen sleeping units, and a trail shack were all built by campers and volunteers.  Most of these structures were erected in the course of a single year, beginning early in 1958.

Fully accredited by the American Camping Association in 1963, Wilderness Canoe Base operated under the Plymouth Christian Youth Center until 2002, when Lake Wapogasset Lutheran Bible Camp, Inc of Amery, Wisconsin agreed to manage the camp's ministry and programming.

The camp has traditionally worked with youth from the inner city of Minneapolis and St. Paul. Since 1998, it has partnered with Project Success, a youth program in Minneapolis public schools, to introduce students to the Boundary Waters.

External links 
 http://www.campwapo.org/camp/wilderness

References

Geography of Minnesota
Buildings and structures in Cook County, Minnesota